Kil is a village in Kragerø municipality, Norway. It is located near Sannidal to the west of Kragerø city and Helle. Its population is 901.

References

Villages in Vestfold og Telemark